Rogovo is a rural locality (a village) in Golovinskoye Rural Settlement, Sudogodsky District, Vladimir Oblast, Russia. The population was 14 as of 2010.

Geography 
Rogovo is located on the Pol River, 33 km west of Sudogda (the district's administrative centre) by road. Golovino is the nearest rural locality.

References 

Rural localities in Sudogodsky District